Pietro Perina (born 28 February 1992) is an Italian football player. He plays for  club Turris.

Club career
He started his senior career with Bari and appeared on the bench as back-up once during the 2010–11 Serie A season.

He moved into the fourth tier with Martina Franca before the 2012–13 season. He made his Serie C debut for Melfi on 30 August 2014 in a game against Savoia.

On 10 July 2015, he signed a two-year contract with Cosenza, also in the Serie C. He spent the second part of the 2017–18 season on loan to Sambenedettese.

For the 2018–19 season, Cosenza advanced to the second-tier Serie B. Perina made his Serie B debut for Cosenza on 26 November 2018 in a game against Crotone. He kept a clean sheet in 5 out of the first 7 Serie B games of his career and finished the season with 11 clean sheets in 23 games played.

On 28 September 2020, he joined Vicenza.

On 26 July 2021, he signed with Serie C club Turris.

References

External links
 

1992 births
People from Andria
Footballers from Apulia
Living people
Italian footballers
Association football goalkeepers
S.S.C. Bari players
A.S. Martina Franca 1947 players
A.S. Melfi players
Cosenza Calcio players
A.S. Sambenedettese players
L.R. Vicenza players
S.S. Turris Calcio players
Serie B players
Serie C players
Sportspeople from the Province of Barletta-Andria-Trani